Ribbon (stylized as riBBon) is the first extended play by South Korea-based Thai rapper and singer BamBam. It was released on June 15, 2021.

Background and release 
Abyss Company announced BamBam's debut as a soloist in South Korea on May 24, 2021. The following day, they revealed he would release an extended play titled Ribbon. Ten sets of photos were released between May 26 and June 8, centering on the symbolic object of the ribbon. The tracklist was disclosed on June 9, while the EP and the music video of the title track "Ribbon" were released on June 15.

Music and lyrics
It contains a message of hope, and BamBam's wish to better himself. Ribbon was also based on the Greek mith of Pandora's box, which spread calamities to the world, but also hope, with the latter symbolized by the ribbon.

The EP consists of an airy lo-fi rhythm instrumental intro, produced by Murda Beatz, and other five tracks, with BamBam co-writing all the lyrics. He also took part in the composition of half of the songs. The homonymous title track, which blends trap and hip hop, was created with the meaning of starting anew as a solo singer, presenting "a hopeful and joyous new version of himself." Talking about "Ribbon", BamBam said "I wanted to make a song that makes me feel a little better while listening to it in the morning when I go to work. This song goes well with the bright image of BamBam."

"Pandora" is a hip hop track with a simple bass loop, in which, after opening Pandora's box, BamBam sings about dealing with his enemies without fear to achieve his goals. "Look So Fine" is a funky dance piece expressing his confidence in front of others, not minding about how the world sees him. On the other hand, "Air" and "Under the Sky" are more laid back: the first, a tropical house tune, is completely in English and describes how being in love and missing your lover makes you feel like running out of air, while the latter is an R&B ballad that sees BamBam expressing the preciousness and gratitude for the past with lyrics such as "The memories I have of those days / The times we cried and laughed / Shaped us into who we are today". It was written while reflecting on Got7's departure from JYP Entertainment in January 2021 and the fans' feelings.

Promotions 
BamBam presented Ribbon and performed "Ribbon", "Pandora" and "Air" during an online showcase aired on June 15 on YouTube, V Live, Shopping Live, and Facebook, and which was watched by more than 740,000 people. He then promoted the title track and "Pandora" on music shows such as M! Countdown, Music Bank, Show! Music Core, Inkigayo, The Show and Show Champion from June 17 to June 27.

Critical reception 

Writing for Rolling Stone India, Divyansha Dongre said that the title song "Ribbon" "underlines the rapper's gleeful persona and style with lyrics embodying a strong metaphorical reference to that of a ribbon, subtly hinting towards BamBam's evolution as a musician." EnVi Magazine noted that each track showcases the singer's versatility. On the other hand, NME gave the EP three stars out of five, stating that BamBam "still has a long way to go in defining his personal music style."

Commercial performance 
Upon release, Ribbon debuted at #2 in South Korea on the Gaon Weekly Album Chart, while the title track "Ribbon" entered the Gaon Digital Chart at #144 and ranked #17 on Billboard World Digital Song Sales Chart.

It ranked seventh on Gaon Monthly Album Chart for June 2021 with 103,156 copies sold, while it entered the Yearly Album Chart at #77 with 134,845 copies.

"Ribbon" received the Black Melody Award for Most Downloaded Song in the first ten days of July 2021 from Line Melody Music Charts in Thailand.

Track listing

Charts

Weekly charts

Year-end charts

References

External links
 
 
  at ManiaDB
 

2021 debut EPs
Korean-language EPs
Albums produced by Murda Beatz